Kallekkad is a suburb of the Palakkad city, Kerala, India. The Armed Reserve Police Camp of Palakkad district is located in Kallekkad.

References

 
 
Suburbs of Palakkad
Cities and towns in Palakkad district